Halodromus is a genus of running crab spiders that was first described by C. Muster in 2009.

Species
 it contains six species, found only in Asia, Africa, and Spain:
Halodromus barbarae Muster, 2009 – Canary Is., Spain, Egypt, Israel, Saudi Arabia
Halodromus deltshevi Muster, 2009 – Yemen
Halodromus gershomi Muster, 2009 – Eritrea
Halodromus patellaris (Wunderlich, 1987) – Cape Verde Is., Canary Is., Spain, Tunisia, Israel
Halodromus patellidens (Levy, 1977) (type) – Cape Verde, Algeria to Middle East
Halodromus vanharteni Logunov, 2011 – United Arab Emirates

See also
 List of Philodromidae species

References

Araneomorphae genera
Philodromidae
Spiders of Africa
Spiders of Asia